Divisional general Raymond Le Corre (1933-2014) was a senior French Army officer. He was commander of the 1st Foreign Cavalry Regiment from 1977 to 1979 and of the Foreign Legion from 1988 to 1992.

Recognitions and Honors 

  Commandeur of the Légion d'Honneur
  Officer of the Ordre national du Mérite
  Croix de la Valeur militaire with 3 citations

References 

French generals
1933 births
2014 deaths